In projective geometry, a desmic system is a set of three tetrahedra in 3-dimensional projective space, such that any two are desmic (related such that each edge of one cuts a pair of opposite edges of the other). The three tetrahedra of a desmic system are contained in a pencil of quartic surfaces.

Every line that passes through two vertices of two tetrahedra in the system also passes through a vertex of the third tetrahedron.
The 12 vertices of the desmic system and the 16 lines formed in this way are the points and lines of a Reye configuration.

Example
The three tetrahedra given by the equations

form a desmic system, contained in the pencil of quartics

for a + b + c = 0.

References
.
.
.

External links 
 Desmic tetrahedra

Projective geometry